Atrak Rural District is a rural district (dehestan) in Dashli Borun District, Gonbad-e Qabus County, Golestan Province, Iran. At the 2006 census, its population was 12,468, in 2,527 families.  The rural district has 26 villages.

References 

Rural Districts of Golestan Province
Gonbad-e Kavus County